Russell Lee Rogers (April 12, 1928 – September 13, 1967), (Lt Col, USAF), was an American electrical engineer, U.S. Air Force officer, test pilot, and astronaut in the X-20 Dyna-Soar program.

Early life and education
Rogers was born on April 12, 1928, in Lawrence, Kansas. He received a Bachelor of Science degree in electrical engineering from the University of Colorado in 1958. He was married with five children.

Test pilot
Rogers flew 142 missions as a fighter pilot during the Korean War. As a USAF Test Pilot School graduate, he was an experimental test pilot at Edwards AFB, California. During this assignment, Rogers served as a key member of the team that tested the Northrop T-38 Talon jet trainer. He was also a member of the Society of Experimental Test Pilots. In April 1960, he was selected for the X-20 program. After several years supporting the Boeing-led program as a pilot consultant, Rogers left the X-20 program on December 10, 1963, when it was cancelled.

After the X-20 program, he remained in the U.S. Air Force on active flight duty as a pilot and was commander of the 12th Tactical Fighter Squadron with the rank of Lt. Colonel at the time of his death.

Death
Rogers was killed when the engine of his F-105 fighter plane failed near Kadena AFB, Okinawa, Japan on September 13, 1967. He ejected from his aircraft, but his parachute failed to deploy properly. He was 39 years old.

References

External links

 Spacefacts biography of Russell L. Rogers
 

1928 births
1967 deaths
American astronauts
American electrical engineers
American Korean War pilots
American test pilots
Aviators from Kansas
Aviators killed in aviation accidents or incidents in Japan
Military personnel from Kansas
People from Lawrence, Kansas
People from Phoenix, Arizona
Recipients of the Air Medal
Recipients of the Distinguished Flying Cross (United States)
United States Air Force officers
University of Colorado alumni
U.S. Air Force Test Pilot School alumni
Victims of aviation accidents or incidents in 1967
20th-century American engineers